The Boys is the debut studio album by English punk rock band The Boys, released in 1977.

Track listing
All tracks composed by Casino Steel and Matt Dangerfield; except where indicated
Side A
"Sick On You" (Matheson, Steel) Lead vocal Kid Reid 
"I Call Your Name" (John Lennon, Paul McCartney) Lead vocal Matt Dangerfield 
"Tumble With Me"  (Matheson, Steel) Lead vocal Kid Reid 
"Tonight"  Lead vocal Matt Dangerfield 
"I Don't Care"  Lead vocal Kid Reid 
"Soda Pressing"  Lead vocal Matt Dangerfield 
"No Money"  Lead vocal Matt Dangerfield 
Side B
"First Time"  (Plain) Lead vocal Kid Reid 
"Box Number"  Lead vocal Kid Reid 
"Kiss Like a Nun"  Lead vocal Matt Dangerfield 
"Cop Cars"   Lead vocal Kid Reid 
"Keep Running"   Lead vocal Matt Dangerfield 
"Tenement Kids"  Lead vocal Matt Dangerfield 
"Living in the City"  Lead vocal Matt Dangerfield

Personnel
Matt Dangerfield – guitar, lead and backing vocals
Honest John Plain – guitar, backing vocals
Casino Steel – piano, backing vocals
Kid Reid – bass, backing and lead vocals
Jack Black – drums

Charts

References

1977 debut albums
The Boys (UK band) albums
Fire Records (UK) albums